Daniel Rossi may refer to:

 Daniel Rossi (bishop) (died 1538), Italian Roman Catholic bishop
 Daniel Rossi (fencer) (born 1920), Uruguayan Olympic fencer
 Daniel Rossi (footballer) (born 1981), Brazilian footballer